The LCRS (Landing Craft Rubber Small) was a small inflatable boat which was used by the United States Navy and USMC from 1938 to 1945. During World War II 8,150 LCRSs were made. It had a weight of 95 kg and could transport seven men.

Army Lt. Lloyd Peddicord of the Observer Group designed an inflatable boat and brought his plans to the Goodyear Tire and Rubber Company, which produced the craft.

The Naval Combat Demolition Units were organised in a six-man team of an officer, a petty officer and four seamen using a seven-man LCRS inflatable boat to carry their explosives and gear.

See also
 Landing Craft Rubber Large
 Rigid-hulled inflatable boat

External links and references
 Specifications and pictures at ibiblio
 Transport Doctrine - Amphibious Forces U.S. Pacific Fleet: Chapter VIII - Rubber Boat Operations (September 1944)

Notes

Inflatable boats
Landing craft
Military boats
Inflatable manufactured goods